BG Rock is the first solo album by the Bulgarian rock musician Georgi Minchev, released in 1987 by the state-owned record company Balkanton. The producers were the well known Bulgarian musicians Petar Slavov and Ivaylo Kraychovski.

The album was originally released on Cassette and Vinyl LP. In 1997, it was re-released on CD format together with the Minchev's second LP Rock'n'Roll Veterans (1989). Most of the songs obtained wide popularity and became classic hits of the Bulgarian rock music genre, most notably "The Bulgarian Rock", "We, The Musicians", "Almost Midnight" and "The Singer's Song".

Despite the fact that Georgi Minchev started his career in the 1960s, he managed to release his first LP not until 1987 because of the artist's constant clash with the local communist authority.

Track listing
All lyrics are written by Georgi Minchev.

Side A:
"Българският рок" / "The Bulgarian Rock" (Minchev/N. Kacharov) - 2:50
"Ние, музикантите" / "We, The Musicians" (Minchev/P. Gyuzelev) - 3:40
"Есен в Созопол" / "Autumn in Sozopol" (Minchev/I. Nikolov) - 3:45
"Малък “Фиат”" / "A Small Fiat" (Minchev/A. Dechev) - 2:33
"Почти полунощ" / "Almost Midnight" (Minchev/A. Dechev) - 3:42

Side B:
"Д-р Иванов" / "Dr. Ivanov" (Minchev/A. Stanchev) - 3:15 
"Песента на певеца" / "The Singer's Song" (Minchev/K. Atanasov) - 2:52
"Урок по Рок" / "A Rock'N'Roll Lesson" (Minchev) - 2:19
"Юли" / "July" (Minchev/A. Stanchev) - 2:58
"Стари тъжни песни" / "Old Sad Songs" (Minchev/V. Kazasyan) - 2:52

Personnel
 Georgi Minchev - All Vocals
 Konstantin Tsekov - Keyboards
 Rumen Boyadzhiev - Keyboards
 Kuzman Birbuchukov - Guitars
 Ivan Lechev - Guitars
 Ivaylo Kraychovski - Bass Guitar
 Yordan Kapitanov - Trumpet
 Tsvetan Petrov - Trumpet
 Lyudmil Georgiev - Clarinet
 Konstantin Atanasov
 Nedyalko Neykov
 Hristiyan Tsekov

References

External links
 Web page dedicated to Georgi Minchev 
 Bulgarian originals from the 1970s and 1980s

1987 debut albums
Georgi Minchev (musician) albums